Belle Meade is a small, unincorporated community in Fauquier County, Virginia, situated on  State Route 55, and bypassed by Interstate 66.  The hamlet is east of the Warren County line in the vicinity of Distillery Road.  The Norfolk Southern Railway B-line runs through it, as well as being near the Appalachian Trail and the G Richard Thompson Wildlife Management Area.

The term 'Belle Meade' is losing local use.

Belle Meade is also the name of a small suburban community in Roanoke County, Southwest Virginia, with the zip code of 24018.

Unincorporated communities in Fauquier County, Virginia
Unincorporated communities in Virginia